Ozothamnus costatifructus  is an uncommon plant in the family Asteraceae, found in Tasmania.

References

costatifructus
Asterales of Australia
Flora of Tasmania